Traffic Department is a 2013 Polish crime film directed by Wojciech Smarzowski. It competed in the main competition section of the 35th Moscow International Film Festival.

Plot
The film is a story of seven policemen who, apart from work, share friendship, parties, sports cars and common interests. Their small, closed world seems to work perfectly well. Everything changes when one of them dies under mysterious circumstances. Sergeant Ryszard Król (Bartek Topa) is accused of the murder. Trying to clear himself of the charges, he discovers the truth about criminal connections at the highest levels of government.

Cast
 Bartłomiej Topa as Ryszard Król
 Arkadiusz Jakubik as Bogdan Petrycki
 Julia Kijowska as Maria Madecka
 Eryk Lubos as Marek Banaś
 Robert Wabich as Henryk Hawryluk
 Jacek Braciak as Jerzy Trybus
 Marcin Dorociński as Krzysztof Lisowski
 Marian Dziędziel as Gołąb
 Agata Kulesza as Jadzia
 Izabela Kuna as Ewa
 Maciej Stuhr as Zaręba
 Henryk Gołębiewski as Driver

References

External links
 

2013 films
2013 crime films
2010s Polish-language films
Polish crime films